The American Academy of Dramatic Arts (AADA) is a private performing arts conservatory with two locations, one in Manhattan and one in Los Angeles. The academy offers an associate degree in occupational studies and teaches drama and related arts in the areas of theater, film, and television. Students also have the opportunity to audition for the third-year theater company. Students can usually transfer completed credits to another college or university to finish a bachelor's degree if they choose.

History
The oldest acting school in the English-speaking world, the academy in New York City was founded in 1884 by Franklin Haven Sargent, a graduate of Harvard University and professor of speech and elocution at his alma mater. Sargent's vision was to establish a school to train actors for the stage. Its first home was the original Lyceum Theatre on what is now Park Avenue South.  In 1963, the school moved to its current home, a landmark building designed by the American Renaissance architect Stanford White for the Colony Club.

In 1974, the academy opened another campus in Pasadena, California, which made it the only professional actor-training school in both major centers of American entertainment. The Los Angeles campus moved from Pasadena to Hollywood in 2001 in a new building next to the Jim Henson Company Lot.

Academics
The academy remains dedicated to training professional actors. It offers a two-year program in which students have to be invited back for the second year. Auditions are held at the end of the second year for the third-year company. As well as training for the theatre, it now offers courses in film and television, providing a structured, professionally oriented program that stresses self-discovery, self-discipline and individuality. Students who graduate in New York receive an Associate of Occupational Studies degree; students who graduate in Hollywood receive a Certificate of Completion or an Associate of Arts degree in acting. Students from New York and Los Angeles can get a Bachelor of Arts degree from selected universities.

Numerous students of the academy have gone on to careers in the entertainment industry. Alumni of the academy have been nominated for 110 Oscars, 317 Emmys and 94 Tonys.

Notable alumni

Notable faculty

Notable faculty include:

 David Dean Bottrell
 Karen Hensel
 Sandy Martin
 Ian Ogilvy
 Scott Reiniger
 Timothy D. Stickney
 Sara Mildred Strauss

Notes and references

Notes

Secondary

Primary

External links

 

Drama schools in the United States
Universities and colleges in Los Angeles County, California
Private universities and colleges in New York (state)
Educational institutions established in 1884
Universities and colleges in Manhattan
 
Theatre in New York City
Private universities and colleges in California
1884 establishments in New York (state)